Elle may refer to:

Arts, entertainment and media
 Elle (magazine), a fashion publication
 Elle Style Awards
 Elle (India), the Indian edition
 Elle (film), a 2016 French film
 Elle: A Modern Cinderella Tale, a 2010 American teen film
 "Elle", a song by Sophie from Product

Language
 Elle (ll), the 14th letter of the Spanish alphabet until 2010
 Elle (Spanish pronoun), a proposed Spanish gender-neutral pronoun
 Elle, one of the French personal pronouns

People
 Elle (name), a female given name
 Ferdinand Elle (1570–1637), French portrait painter

Places
 Elle, Central African Republic, a village
 Elle (river), a river in Normandy, France
 Ellé, a river in Brittany, France

Other uses
 Elle (sport), a Sri Lankan game similar to baseball
 Elle, an obsolete German unit of measurement

See also 

 Ælle of Sussex (fl. c. 477–c. 514?), first king of the South Saxons
 Ell
 ELL (disambiguation)
 Aelle (disambiguation)
 Elles
 (Elle) the most unique name = (French) Pronounced as the letter "L"